The Brazilian Labour Party (PTB) was a populist political party in Brazil founded in 1945 by supporters of President Getúlio Vargas. It was dismantled by the Institutional Act Number Two in 1965 during the military dictatorship in Brazil.

History
The party was founded by followers of President Getúlio Vargas on May 15, 1945, during the final days of his Estado Novo. It grew rapidly under the leadership  of Vargas, the most important Brazilian politician of the early to mid-20th century. Its main goal was to prevent a growth of Communist Party membership among urban workers. According to Vargas himself,  the party was created to "serve as a buffer between the unions and the communists."

PTB's support came from the trade unions controlled by the Ministry of Labour, and its trump card was the prestige of Getúlio Vargas, its honorary chairman, which introduced social and labor legislation in the country. From 1945 to 1962, PTB was the third force in Brazilian politics, after the Social Democratic Party (PSD) and the National Democratic Union (UDN), but it became more popular than the UDN in the 1962 Congressional elections. In 1950, Vargas was elected to a second term through PTB. Vargas committed suicide in 1954, and his heir João Goulart became the central figure in the party along with the populist Leonel Brizola.

Since the party was a close ally of PSD, also founded by supporters of the late Vargas, it remained in power when Juscelino Kubitschek was elected President in 1955. Goulart was elected Vice President in 1955 and 1960, becoming President in 1961 with the resignation of Jânio Quadros. PTB was in power again, but Goulart was overthrown by a military-led coup d'état in 1964. Various PTB figures were removed from the National Congress, and all political parties, including PTB, were dissolved on October 27, 1965.   Nearly all of the party merged with the bulk of the PSD to form the Brazilian Democratic Movement, the only opposition party permitted for the first decade of the military dictatorship.

A new PTB, this time a centre-right  party, was established by Ivete Vargas, Getúlio's niece, in 1980, with the end of the artificial two-party system imposed by the military regime.  Brizola led the majority of the PTB's former followers into the Democratic Labour Party.

References

Defunct political parties in Brazil
Labour parties
Political parties established in 1945
Social democratic parties in Brazil
Political parties disestablished in 1965
1945 establishments in Brazil
1964 disestablishments in Brazil
Vargas Era
Banned socialist parties